This is a list of Conventions signed at The Hague by member states of the Hague Conference on Private International Law.

Conventions adopted before 1945
Convention of 12 June 1902 relating to the settlement of the conflict of the laws concerning marriage
Convention of 12 June 1902 relating to the settlement of the conflict of laws and jurisdictions as regards to divorce and separation
Convention of 12 June 1902 relating to the settlement of guardianship of minors
Convention of 17 July 1905 relating to civil procedure
Convention of 17 July 1905 relating to conflicts of laws with regard to the effects of marriage on the rights and duties of the spouses in their personal relationship and with regard to their estates
Convention of 17 July 1905 relating to deprivation of civil rights and similar measures of protection

Conventions
Statute of the Hague Conference on Private International Law
Convention of 1 March 1954 on civil procedure
Convention of 15 June 1955 on the law applicable to international sales of goods
Convention of 15 April 1958 on the law governing transfer of title in international sales of goods
Convention of 15 April 1958 on the jurisdiction of the selected forum in the case of international sales of goods
Convention of 15 June 1955 relating to the settlement of the conflicts between the law of nationality and the law of domicile
Convention of 1 June 1956 concerning the recognition of the legal personality of foreign companies, associations and institutions
Convention of 24 October 1956 on the law applicable to maintenance obligations towards children
Convention of 15 April 1958 concerning the recognition and enforcement of decisions relating to maintenance obligations towards children
Convention of 5 October 1961 concerning the powers of authorities and the law applicable in respect of the protection of minors
Convention of 5 October 1961 on the Conflicts of Laws relating to the Form of Testamentary Dispositions
Convention of 5 October 1961 Abolishing the Requirement of Legalisation for Foreign Public Documents
Convention of 15 November 1965 on Jurisdiction, Applicable Law and Recognition of Decrees Relating to Adoptions
Convention of 15 November 1965 on the Service Abroad of Judicial and Extrajudicial Documents in Civil or Commercial Matters
Convention of 25 November 1965 on the Choice of Court
Convention of 1 February 1971 on the Recognition and Enforcement of Foreign Judgments in Civil and Commercial Matters
Supplementary Protocol of 1 February 1971 to the Convention on the Recognition and Enforcement of Foreign Judgments in Civil and Commercial Matters
Convention of 1 June 1970 on the Recognition of Divorces and Legal Separations
Convention of 4 May 1971 on the Law Applicable to Traffic Accidents
Convention of 18 March 1970 on the Taking of Evidence Abroad in Civil or Commercial Matters
Convention of 2 October 1973 concerning the International Administration of the Estates of Deceased Persons
Convention of 2 October 1973 on the Law Applicable to Products Liability
Convention of 2 October 1973 on the Recognition and Enforcement of Decisions relating to Maintenance Obligations
Convention of 2 October 1973 on the Law Applicable to Maintenance Obligations
Convention of 14 March 1978 on the Law Applicable to Matrimonial Property Regimes
Convention of 14 March 1978 on Celebration and Recognition of the Validity of Marriages
Convention of 14 March 1978 on the Law Applicable to Agency
Convention of 25 October 1980 on the Civil Aspects of International Child Abduction
Convention of 25 October 1980 on International Access to Justice
Convention of 1 July 1985 on the Law Applicable to Trusts and on their Recognition
Convention of 22 December 1986 on the Law Applicable to Contracts for the International Sale of Goods
Convention of 1 August 1989 on the Law Applicable to Succession to the Estates of Deceased Persons
Convention of 29 May 1993 on Protection of Children and Co-operation in respect of Intercountry Adoption
Convention of 19 October 1996 on Jurisdiction, Applicable Law, Recognition, Enforcement and Co-operation in respect of Parental Responsibility and Measures for the Protection of Children
Convention of 13 January 2000 on the International Protection of Adults
Convention of 5 July 2006 on the Law Applicable to Certain Rights in respect of Securities held with an Intermediary
Convention of 30 June 2005 on Choice of Court Agreements
Convention of 23 November 2007 on International Recovery of Child Support and Other Forms of Family Maintenance
Protocol of 23 November 2007 on the Law Applicable to Maintenance Obligations
Principles on Choice of Law in International Commercial Contracts
Convention of 2 July 2019 on the Recognition and Enforcement of Foreign Judgments in Civil or Commercial Matters 

List
Hague Conventions on Private Law